Harrison Williams may refer to:

Harrison A. Williams (1919–2001), U.S. Senator from New Jersey
Harrison Williams (entrepreneur) (1873–1953), American entrepreneur who made millions in public utilities
Harrison Williams (athlete) (born 1996), American athlete

See also
Harry Williams (disambiguation)